The 1989 NAIA World Series was the 33rd annual tournament hosted by the National Association of Intercollegiate Athletics to determine the national champion of baseball among its member colleges and universities in the United States and Canada.

The tournament was played at Harris Field in Lewiston, Idaho.

Hometown team and two-time defending champions Lewis–Clark State (41–24) defeated Saint Francis (IL) (53–21) in a single-game championship series, 5–2, to win the Warriors' fifth NAIA World Series. This would go on to be the third of six consecutive World Series championships for the program.

Lewis–Clark State pitcher John NesSmith was named tournament MVP.

Bracket

Preliminary bracket

Championship bracket

See also
 1989 NCAA Division I baseball tournament
 1989 NCAA Division II baseball tournament
 1989 NCAA Division III baseball tournament
 1989 NAIA Softball World Series

Reference

|NAIA World Series
NAIA World Series
NAIA World Series
NAIA World Series